Sinful Woman is a detective novel by James M. Cain that appeared originally as a paperback in 1947 by Avon publishers. Sinful Woman was the most commercially successful of three paperbacks Cain wrote for Avon in the late 1940s and early 1950s (the other two are Jealous Woman (1950) and The Root of His Evil (1951)).

Plot Summary

The story is set in Nevada during the early 1940s. Hollywood screen star Sylvia Shoreham is in Reno, having just finalized her divorce with her now ex-husband cum manager.  Shoreman remains resentful that her genuine talent had been squandered in demeaning screen roles.  When her former spouse is suddenly found dead, Shoreham comes under suspicion. County Sheriff Parker Lewis is assigned to investigate, but discovers that the suspect is the same movie actress he has idolized for years, based on her early screen portrayal of a noble and self-sacrificing young woman. Lucas wishes to serve as Shoreman's champion and mentor, despite her apparent moral lapses. Shoreman suspects that her sister, Hazel, is the murderer, but she attempts to shoulder the blame to shield her sibling. The situation is complicated when Hollywood executives make a clumsy attempt to shelter their movie star Shoreman from the tabloids by framing the death as a suicide.

The high-minded Lucas and the noble Shoreman discover that they are in love. The mystery is solved when an eyewitness to the accidental death testifies in court. The story ends happily, and the couple helps to raise funds for a tubercular hospital in Reno.

Publication Background

The story was originally based on Cain's 1938 play 7-11. Cain derived a serial from the play's scenario entitled “Galloping Dominos” which was never published. The serial was reworked to form a novel, and Avon released it under the title Sinful Woman in 1947. Cain's decision to create original novels for paperback editions alarmed his long-time hardback publisher Alfred A. Knopf, according to biographer Roy Hoopes:

Avon publishers provided Cain with a $500 advance for the story, the first of three paperback novellas that he wrote for them.

Critical Assessment

Cain's most successful novels were written from the first-person confessional point-of-view. In Sinful Woman, he employs an omniscience third-person narrator, but with less success than his 1941 novel Mildred Pierce. Literary critic Paul Skenazy writes:

Skenazy adds: “The language [in Sinful Woman] is a weird combination, [both] euphemistic and crude, and the sexuality is at once smutty and dull.” Biographer and novelist David Madden reports that Cain “has never written for the pulps, but observes:

Cain himself did not consider Sinful Woman, nor his other works written for paperback as commendable works, and rarely acknowledged as part of his oeuvre.

Footnotes

Sources 
Hoopes, Roy. 1982. Cain. Holt, Reinhart and Winston. New York. 
Madden, David. 1970. James M. Cain. Twayne Publishers, Inc. Library Catalog Card Number: 78-120011.
Skenazy, Paul. 1989. James M. Cain. Continuum Publishing Company. New York. 

1947 novels